Panzdah-e Khordad Metro Station (15th Khordad metro station) is a station in Tehran Metro Line 1. It is located in Panzdah-e Khordad Square, junction of Khayam Street and Panzdah-e-Khordad Street. It is between Khayam Metro Station and Imam Khomeini Metro Station. The square and the metro station below are named after the 1963 demonstrations in Iran, which in the Iranian calendar took place on 15th Khordad, 1342.

References

Tehran Metro stations